The National Penghu University of Science and Technology (NPU) is a public university located in Magong City, Penghu, Taiwan. It is one of the few higher education institutions located outside of Taiwan Island.

the university offers a range of undergraduate and graduate programs, including Bachelor's and Master's degrees in Marine Engineering, Naval Architecture, and Fisheries, as well as degrees in Business Administration, Tourism, and Applied Foreign Languages.

History
The university was originally established in 1991 as the Penghu Branch of Kaohsiung Marine Academy. On 1 July 1995, it became an independent institution named National Penghu Marine Academy. On 1 August 2000, it was upgraded to National Penghu Institute of Technology and upgraded again on 1 August 2005 to become National Penghu University.

Academic structure

College of Ocean Resource and Engineering 
The Graduate Institute of Ocean Creative Industry
Department of Aquaculture
Department of Food Science
Department of Electrical Engineering
Department of Computer Science & Information Engineering
Department of Communication Engineering

College of Humanities and Management 
Graduate Institute of Service Management
Department of Applied Foreign Languages
Department of Information Management
Department of Marketing and Logistics Management
Department of Shipping & Transportation Management

College of Tourism and Leisure 
Department of Marine Sports and Recreation
Department of Hospitality Management
Department of Tourism and Leisure Management

See also
 List of universities in Taiwan

References

External links 

  

1995 establishments in Taiwan
Buildings and structures in Penghu County
Educational institutions established in 1995
Universities and colleges in Taiwan
Scientific organizations based in Taiwan
Technical universities and colleges in Taiwan